Ermil Gheorghiu (13 February 1896, Botoșani – 14 January 1977, Bucharest) was a Romanian general and commander of the Romanian Air Force during World War II. He was a recipient of the Knight's Cross of the Iron Cross.

Awards

 Knight's Cross of the Iron Cross (4 April 1944)

References

Citations

Bibliography

 

1896 births
1977 deaths
People from Botoșani
Romanian Air Force generals
Romanian military personnel of World War II
Recipients of the Knight's Cross of the Iron Cross